Dylan De Belder (born 3 April 1992) is a Belgian footballer who currently plays for Deinze in the Belgian First Division B.

References

External links

1992 births
Living people
Belgian footballers
Belgium under-21 international footballers
Belgium youth international footballers
R.A.E.C. Mons players
S.K. Beveren players
Lommel S.K. players
Lierse S.K. players
Cercle Brugge K.S.V. players
K.M.S.K. Deinze players
Belgian Pro League players
Challenger Pro League players

Association football defenders